Kosino may refer to:

Kosino, Poland, a village in Masovian Voivodeship, Poland
Kosino, Russia, several inhabited localities in Russia
Kosino (Moscow Metro), a station on the Moscow Metro, Moscow, Russia
Kosino railway station, a Moscow Railway station

See also
Kosino-Ukhtomsky District, a district in the Eastern Administrative Okrug of the federal city of Moscow, Russia